The Cham script is a Brahmic abugida used to write Cham, an Austronesian language spoken by some 245,000 Chams in Vietnam and Cambodia. It is written horizontally left to right, just like other Brahmic abugidas.

History
The Cham script is a descendant of the Brahmi script of India. Cham was one of the first scripts to develop from a script called the Pallava script some time around 200 CE. It came to Southeast Asia as part of the expansion of Hinduism and Buddhism. Hindu stone temples of the Champa civilization contain both Sanskrit and Chamic language stone inscriptions. The earliest inscriptions in Vietnam are found in Mỹ Sơn, a temple complex dated to around 400 CE. The oldest inscription is written in faulty Sanskrit. After this, inscriptions alternate between Sanskrit and the Cham language of the times.

Cham kings studied classical Indian texts such as the Dharmaśāstra and inscriptions make reference to Sanskrit literature. Eventually, while the Cham and Sanskrit languages influenced one another, Cham culture assimilated Hinduism, and Chams were eventually able to adequately express the Hindu religion in their own language. By the 8th century, the Cham script had outgrown Sanskrit and the Cham language was in full use. Most preserved manuscripts focus on religious rituals, epic battles and poems, and myths.

Modern Chamic languages have the Southeast Asian areal features of monosyllabicity, tonality, and glottalized consonants. However, they had reached the Southeast Asia mainland disyllabic and non-tonal. The script needed to be altered to meet these changes.

Variety
The Cham now live in two groups: the Western Cham of Cambodia and the Eastern Cham (Phan Rang Cham) of Vietnam. For the first millennium AD, the Chamic languages were a dialect chain along the Vietnam coast. The breakup of this chain into distinct languages occurred once the Vietnamese pushed south, causing most Cham to move back into the highlands while some like Phan Rang Cham became a part of the lowland society ruled by the Vietnamese. The division of Cham into Western and Phan Rang Cham immediately followed the Vietnamese overthrow of the last Cham polity. The Western Cham people are mostly Muslim and therefore prefer the Arabic script. The Eastern Cham are mostly Hindu and continued to use the Indic script. During French colonial times, both groups had to use the Latin alphabet.

There are two varieties of the Cham script: Akhar Thrah (Eastern Cham) and Akhar Srak (Western Cham). The two are distinct enough to be encoded in separate blocks. A standard ALA-LC romanization of both varieties, which is based on EFEO romanization of Cham, is available.

Usage
The script is highly valued in Cham culture, but this does not mean that many people are learning it. There have been efforts to simplify the spelling and to promote learning the script, but these have met with limited success. Traditionally, boys learned the script around the age of twelve when they were old and strong enough to tend to the water buffalo. However, women and girls did not typically learn to read. The traditional Indic Cham script is still known and used by Vietnam's Eastern Cham but no longer by the Western Cham.

Structure
Similar to other abugidas, the consonants of Cham have the inherent vowel. Dependent vowel diacritics are used to modify the inherent vowel. Since Cham does not have virāma, special characters should be used for pure consonants. This practice is similar to the chillu consonants of the Malayalam script.

A diacritic called kai, which does not occur with the other consonants, is added below a nasal consonant to write the  vowel.

Cham words contain vowel and consonant-vowel (V and CV) syllables, apart from the last, which may also be CVC. There are a few characters for final consonants in the Cham script; other consonants merely extend a longer tail on the right side to indicate the absence of a final vowel.

Consonants

Medial consonants

Final consonants
Cham does not employ a virama to suppress vowels.

Independent vowels
Six of the initial vowels are represented with unique letters:

Dependent vowels
Other initial vowels are represented by adding a diacritic to the letter  (a).  The same diacritics are used with consonants to change their inherent vowel:

Numerals
Cham has a distinctive set of digits:

Other symbols

Unicode

Cham script was added to the Unicode Standard in April, 2008 with the release of version 5.1.

The Unicode block for Cham is U+AA00–U+AA5F:

Notes

References

Bibliography

Blood, Doris (1980a). Cham literacy: the struggle between old and new (a case study). Notes on Literacy 12, 6-9.
Blood, Doris (1980b). The script as a cohesive factor in Cham society. In Notes from Indochina, Marilyn Gregersen and Dorothy Thomas (eds.), 35-44. Dallas: International Museum of Cultures.
Blood, Doris E. 2008. The ascendancy of the Cham script: how a literacy workshop became the catalyst. International Journal of the Sociology of Language 192:45-56.
Brunelle, Marc. 2008. Diglossia, Bilingualism, and the Revitalization of Written Eastern Cham. Language Documentation & Conservation 2.1: 28-46. (Web based journal)
Moussay, Gerard (1971). Dictionnaire Cam-Vietnamien-Français. Phan Rang: Centre Culturel Cam.
Trankell, Ing-Britt and Jan Ovesen (2004).  Muslim minorities in Cambodia.  NIASnytt 4, 22-24. (Also on Web)
R. Malatesha Joshi, Catherine McBride(2019). Handbook of Literacy in Akshara Orthography

External links

 Omniglot Entry on Cham
 more info on Cham alphabet (in Spanish)
 Brunelle's article
 Conservation of Cham language and script on Lauthara.org
 https://www.unicode.org/L2/L2022/22095-western-cham.pdf

Brahmic scripts